Francken is a Dutch patronymic surname, meaning "son of Frank". People with this name include:

Christian Francken (c.1550–c.1611), German Jesuit writer
Christoph Bernhard Francken or Francke (1670–1729), German military officer and painter
Frank Francken (born 1964), Belgian racing cyclist
 (c.1720–1791), Dutch-born merchant and freemason in the West Indies 
Jacques Francken (1891–1949), Dutch footballer, brother of Mannes
Mannes Francken (1888–1948), Dutch footballer, brother of Jacques
Ruth Francken (1924–2006), Czech-American sculptor, painter, and furniture designer
Theo Francken (born 1978), Belgian New Flemish Alliance politician
The Francken family of Flemish painters:
 Frans Francken the Elder (or Frans Francken I 1542–1616), his two sons:
Hieronymus Francken II, son of Frans I, brother of Frans II, Antwerp 1578–1623
Frans Francken the Younger (or Frans II, Antwerp, 1581–1642)
Frans Francken III, son of Frans II, 1607–1667
Hieronymus Francken III, son of Frans II, 1611–1671
Constantijn Francken, son of Hieronymus III, 1661–1717
 Ambrosius Francken I, brother of Frans I, 1544–1618
 Hieronymus Francken I, brother of Frans I, c. 1540-1610, mostly worked in France
Isabella Francken, probable daughter of Hieronymus I, active about 1600-1625
Fictitious
Fritz Francken, pseudonym of Flemish writer Frederik Edward Clijmans (1893–1969)
Jan Baptist Francken, non-existing member of the Flemish family of painters
Sebastiaen Francken, name never used by the unrelated Flemish painter Sebastiaen Vrancx (1573–1647)

See also
Franken (surname), variant spelling of the same surname
Franken (disambiguation), for other meanings
Francke, German surname

References

Dutch-language surnames
Patronymic surnames